Bodman-Ludwigshafen is a municipality in the district of Konstanz in Baden-Württemberg in Germany, located on the most western shore of Lake Überlingen, the north-western part of the Upper Lake of Lake Constance. The municipality consist of the two separate villages Bodman and Ludwigshafen on each side of Lake Überlingen. In 1975, the former municipalities Ludwigshafen am Bodensee and Bodman united to the current administrative situation. The German term for Lake Constance, Bodensee, derives from Bodman.

World heritage site
It is home to one or more prehistoric pile-dwelling (or stilt house) settlements that are part of the Prehistoric Pile dwellings around the Alps UNESCO World Heritage Site.

Twin towns
Bodman-Ludwigshafen is twinned with:

  Mügeln, Germany, since 2000

References

External links

 
 Bodman-Ludwigshafen: History & Information

Konstanz (district)